Nathan Choate (born October 22, 1978) is an American college baseball coach and former pitcher. He is the head baseball coach of Loyola Marymount University. Choate played college baseball at Santa Ana College from 1998 to 1999 before transferring to California Polytechnic State University where he played for coach Ritch Price in 2000 and 2001.

Playing career
Choate attended Esperanza High School where he was a member of the school's baseball team. After graduation, Choate choose to attend Santa Ana College. After two seasons at Santa Ana, Choate transferred to Cal Poly.

Coaching career
On June 10, 2011, Choate was named the pitching coach and recruiting coordinator for Grand Canyon. On June 24, 2016, Choate was named the pitching coach at San Diego. On August 20, 2018, Choate was named the pitching coach at Loyola Marymount. In 2019, he helped lead the Lions to a return to the NCAA Tournament, a 2019 WCC Tournament Title and WCC Pitcher of the Year Codie Paiva.

On June 25, 2019, Choate was named the head coach of Loyola Marymount.

Head coaching record

See also
 List of current NCAA Division I baseball coaches

References

External links
Loyola Marymount Lions bio

Living people
1978 births
Baseball pitchers
Santa Ana Dons baseball players
Cal Poly Mustangs baseball players
High school baseball coaches in the United States
UC Irvine Anteaters baseball coaches
UC Riverside Highlanders baseball coaches
Grand Canyon Antelopes baseball coaches
San Diego Toreros baseball coaches
Loyola Marymount Lions baseball coaches
Baseball coaches from California